The Explosive Side of Sarah Vaughan is a 1963 studio album by Sarah Vaughan, arranged by Benny Carter.

This was Vaughan's second album with Carter. Her first, The Lonely Hours, was released in 1963.

Reception

The AllMusic review by Scott Yanow awarded the album three stars and said that Vaughan was "frequently miraculous [...] Throughout, Vaughan is in prime voice, overcoming the weaker material and uplifting the more superior songs".

Track listing
 "I Believe in You" (Frank Loesser) – 3:05
 "Honeysuckle Rose" (Andy Razaf, Fats Waller) – 3:01
 "Moonlight on the Ganges" (Sherman Myers, Chester Wallace) – 2:37
 "The Lady's in Love with You" (Burton Lane, Frank Loesser) – 2:14
 "After You've Gone" (Henry Creamer, Turner Layton) – 2:38
 "A Garden in the Rain" (James Dyrenforth, Carroll Gibbons) – 3:16
 "I Can't Give You Anything but Love" (Dorothy Fields, Jimmy McHugh) – 3:09
 "The Trolley Song" (Ralph Blane, Hugh Martin) – 2:37
 "I'm Gonna Live Until I Die" (Manny Curtis, Al Hoffman, Walter Kent) – 2:05
 "Falling in Love with Love" (Lorenz Hart, Richard Rodgers) – 2:29
 "Great Day" (Edward Eliscu, Billy Rose, Vincent Youmans) – 2:02
 "Nobody Else but Me" (Oscar Hammerstein II, Jerome Kern) – 3:11

Personnel
Sarah Vaughan – vocals
Benny Carter – arranger, conductor

References

1963 albums
Albums arranged by Benny Carter
Albums conducted by Benny Carter
Roulette Records albums
Sarah Vaughan albums